Korzh means flatbread in several Slavic languages. It is also a gender-neutral Slavic surname that may refer to
Vasily Korzh (1899–1967), Belarusian resistance leader during World War II
Vitaliy Korzh (born 1987), Ukrainian sprinter
Dmitriy Korzh (born 1971), Turkmen football player and coach

See also
Korzhev